Redwood is a suburb located in Christchurch, New Zealand which includes the sub-division of Redwood Springs.  The suburb was first named Styx but renamed following a popular vote of local residents in the 1960s after a large Sequoia redwood tree still standing in Prestons Road.  The original forest cover was Totara and Kahikatea.
Redwood has its own community radio station called Good Music FM 107.5 (formerly known as Radio Redwood).

Demographics

Redwood, comprising the statistical areas of Redwood North, Redwood West and Redwood East, had a population of 8,184 at the 2018 New Zealand census, an increase of 72 people (0.9%) since the 2013 census, and a decrease of 147 people (-1.8%) since the 2006 census. There were 3,051 households. There were 3,990 males and 4,194 females, giving a sex ratio of 0.95 males per female, with 1,587 people (19.4%) aged under 15 years, 1,632 (19.9%) aged 15 to 29, 3,705 (45.3%) aged 30 to 64, and 1,260 (15.4%) aged 65 or older.

Ethnicities were 83.4% European/Pākehā, 11.9% Māori, 3.2% Pacific peoples, 9.2% Asian, and 2.4% other ethnicities (totals add to more than 100% since people could identify with multiple ethnicities).

The proportion of people born overseas was 18.2%, compared with 27.1% nationally.

Although some people objected to giving their religion, 51.5% had no religion, 37.1% were Christian, 1.0% were Hindu, 0.8% were Muslim, 0.7% were Buddhist and 2.3% had other religions.

Of those at least 15 years old, 1,047 (15.9%) people had a bachelor or higher degree, and 1,437 (21.8%) people had no formal qualifications. The employment status of those at least 15 was that 3,354 (50.8%) people were employed full-time, 1,002 (15.2%) were part-time, and 255 (3.9%) were unemployed.

Education
Redwood School and Northcote School are contributing primary schools catering for years 1 to 6. Redwood School opened in 1969, and Northcote in 1960.

External links
 Rainbow Springs Nature Park is forested with California redwood trees, originally planted in 1931.

References 

Suburbs of Christchurch